Roots is an album by American trombonist, composer and arranger Slide Hampton recorded in 1985 and released on the Dutch Criss Cross Jazz label.

Reception

AllMusic reviewer Ron Wynn stated: "A tremendous 1985 quintet session with trombonist Slide Hampton heading a distinguished group and nicely teaming with tenor saxophonist Clifford Jordan in a first-rate hard bop front line."

Track listing
 "Precipice" (Clifford Jordan) – 10:25
 "Solar" (Miles Davis) – 11:30
 "Roots" (Slide Hampton) – 8:25
 "Maple Street" (Cedar Walton) – 9:24
 "My Old Flame" (Arthur Johnston, Sam Coslow) – 10:40 Bonus track on CD
 "Just in Time" (Jule Styne, Betty Comden, Adolph Green) – 4:11 Bonus track on CD 	
 "Precipice" [alternate take] (Jordan) – 10:22 Bonus track on CD 	
 "Barbados" (Charlie Parker) – 5:17 Bonus track on CD

Personnel
Slide Hampton – trombone, arranger
Clifford Jordan – tenor saxophone
Cedar Walton – piano
David Williams – bass 
Billy Higgins – drums

References 

Criss Cross Jazz albums
Slide Hampton albums
1985 albums